Character Is Destiny: Inspiring Stories Every Young Person Should Know and Every Adult Should Remember is a 2005 book by United States Senator John McCain with Mark Salter.  Published by Random House, it is a collection of biographies about individuals from the past and present who, in the authors' view, exemplify the best qualities of character.  
The book is divided into seven parts with further divisions of a characteristic and a person who is seen to exemplify it.

Introductory notes
In McCain's words from the book's introduction:

Sections
Each section provides examples of a specific characteristic, with essays on a well known person, historical or (then) living, whose life reflected a particular aspect of that characteristic.

Part One: Honor
 HONESTY -- Thomas More
 RESPECT -- Mohandas Karamchand Gandhi
 AUTHENTICITY -- Joan of Arc
 LOYALTY -- Sir Ernest Shackleton
 DIGNITY -- Viktor Frankl

Part Two: Purpose
 IDEALISM -- Sojourner Truth
 RIGHTEOUSNESS -- Roméo Dallaire
 CITIZENSHIP -- Pat Tillman
 DILIGENCE -- Winston Churchill
 RESPONSIBILITY -- Lord Nelson and His Lieutenants
 COOPERATION -- John Wooden

Part Three: Strength
 COURAGE -- Edith Cavell
 SELF-CONTROL -- George Washington
 CONFIDENCE -- Elizabeth I
 RESILIENCE -- Abraham Lincoln
 INDUSTRY -- Eric Hoffer
 HOPEFULNESS -- John Winthrop

Part Four: Understanding
 FAITH -- Christian Guard at Hua Lo Prison
 COMPASSION -- Maximillian Kolbe
 MERCY -- Mother Antonia
 TOLERANCE -- The Four Chaplains
 FORGIVENESS -- Nelson Mandela
 GENEROSITY -- Oseola McCarty

Part Five: Judgment
 FAIRNESS -- Dr. Martin Luther King Jr.
 HUMILITY -- Dwight D. Eisenhower
 GRATITUDE -- Tecumseh
 HUMOR -- Mark Twain
 COURTESY -- Aung San Suu Kyi

Part Six: Creativity
 ASPIRATION -- Ferdinand Magellan
 DISCERNMENT -- Leonardo da Vinci
 CURIOSITY -- Charles Darwin
 ENTHUSIASM -- Theodore Roosevelt
 EXCELLENCE -- Wilma Rudolph

Part Seven: Love
 SELFLESSNESS AND CONTENTMENT -- Mother Teresa

Editions
 McCain, John. Character Is Destiny: Inspiring Stories Every Young Person Should Know and Every Adult Should Remember. New York: Random House, 2005. Print.

References

External links
 Presentation by McCain on Character Is Destiny, December 6, 2005, C-SPAN

Character is Destiny
Books by John McCain
Random House books
Books by Mark Salter
Collaborative non-fiction books